Envia is a spider genus in the family Microstigmatidae, found only in Brazil.

Species
, the World Spider Catalog accepted the following species:

Envia garciai Ott & Höfer, 2003 (type species) – Brazil
Envia moleque Miglio & Bonaldo, 2011 – Brazil

References

Spiders of Brazil
Mygalomorphae genera